Marrisa Shen was a 13-year-old Canadian girl whose body was found in a wooded area in Central Park in Burnaby, British Columbia, Canada, on July 19, 2017.

Shen had been reported missing by her parents a day earlier when she failed to return home. The police used the GPS device in her mobile phone to locate her body in the public park. The RCMP said the attack appeared to be random. After Shen's death, RCMP told parents to talk to their kids about safety and warned the public to be vigilant. Days later, the police said that based on its investigations, the case would be considered a homicide. 

At its peak, nearly three hundred officers were involved in the investigation. Some "2,000 persons of interest" were investigated and were ruled out in the case. There was little progress in the case for more than a year and on the one-year anniversary of Shen's death, her family issued a letter asking the public's assistance in locating and bringing her attacker to justice.

On September 7, 2018, RCMP arrested Ibrahim Ali, a Syrian refugee, for the murder of Marrisa Shen.

Suspect 
In a breakthrough in the case, and after a 14-month impasse from the date of the murder, on September 7, 2018, RCMP arrested Ibrahim Ali (born in 1990 in Syria) as a primary suspect for the murder of Marrisa Shen. Police had used a DNA dragnet technique to identify the suspect. On September 10, 2018, RCMP's Integrated Homicide Investigation Team (IHIT) gave details of his alleged involvement in a press conference saying Ali was arrested on September 7, 2018.

Ali had arrived in Canada as a refugee from Syria in April 2017 just months before her murder, police say, and was sponsored by a coalition of families on Bowen Island, as well as Vancouver's St Andrew's Wesley United Church. He has been charged with first-degree murder of Shen. Now a permanent resident of Canada, police say he had no previous criminal history. He briefly appeared in court on September 14, with trial initially set for October 12, 2018 but subsequently pushed back to September 2022, and then again to January 2023.

Politicization 
Ali's status as a recent Syrian refugee raised questions about Prime Minister Justin Trudeau's immigration policy. Ali's court appearances were picketed by protesters calling for "comprehensive security screening" for refugee migration from Syria and to "hold Trudeau accountable." Members of the Syrian-Canadian community also held vigils in remembrance of Shen, oftentimes alongside the protests opposing refugee migration from Syria.

The discussion surrounding the killing became a significant point of contention during the February 2019 federal by-election for Burnaby South, with People's Party candidate Laura-Lynn Thompson and a former Shen family spokesperson, Valentine Wu, integrating Shen's death as major parts of their campaign platforms. Karen Wang, a Liberal candidate who later renounced her candidacy for the by-election due to an unrelated racist scandal, was also a known family friend of the Shen family. Additionally, Conservative MP Michelle Rempel invoked Shen's murder in a call for immigration screening review reform.

A spokesperson for Shen's mother communicated that while she appreciates the attention given to Marrisa's murder, she does not want the case to become political— instead, "they should focus on the violence against women and children in our society, especially women of colour."

References

External links 
 Marrisa Shen website (Archived on September 11, 2018)
 Marrisa Shen murder protest outside Vancouver court house at 222 Main Street    (June 4, 2019)

2017 murders in Canada
2017 in British Columbia
2017 deaths
Burnaby
Deaths by person in Canada
Formerly missing people
July 2017 crimes in North America
July 2017 events in Canada
Murder in British Columbia
Murdered Canadian children